Aberbargoed Hospital was a community hospital in Aberbargoed, Caerphilly County Borough, Wales. It was managed by the Aneurin Bevan University Health Board.

History
The hospital was commissioned by the Powell Duffryn Steam Coal Company to provide hospital facilities for their employees in the Rhymney Valley. The 14 bed-facility was opened by Viscount Tredegar on 10 December 1909. The hospital was subsequently maintained by the men themselves, who made contributions towards its upkeep.

After services were temporarily transferred Caerphilly District Miners Hospital, Aberbargoed Hospital closed in November 2010. The closure anticipated the opening of the new Ysbyty Ystrad Fawr facility at Ystrad Mynach which became the permanent acute facility in the area in March 2012. The hospital was subsequently demolished and the site was redeveloped for residential use in 2015.

References

Hospital buildings completed in 1909
1909 establishments in Wales
Defunct hospitals in Wales
Hospitals disestablished in 2010
Hospitals in Caerphilly County Borough